Fred Pointer is an Australian Paralympic athlete and wheelchair basketball player. At the 1980 Arnhem Games, he competed in four athletics events and won two bronze medals in the Men's 400 m 3 and Men's Slalom 3 events. He was also part of the Australia men's national wheelchair basketball team at the 1980 games.

References

External links
 

Paralympic athletes of Australia
Paralympic wheelchair basketball players of Australia
Athletes (track and field) at the 1980 Summer Paralympics
Wheelchair basketball players at the 1980 Summer Paralympics
Paralympic bronze medalists for Australia
Year of birth missing (living people)
Living people
Medalists at the 1980 Summer Paralympics
Paralympic medalists in athletics (track and field)
Australian male wheelchair racers